Cerastis faceta is a moth of the family Noctuidae. It was described by Treitschke in 1835. It is found in Morocco, Algeria, Tunisia, Spain, Portugal, France, Italy, as well as on Corsica, Sardinia, Malta and Sicily.

The wingspan is 30–32 mm. Adults are on wing from February to April.

The larvae are polyphagous on low-growing plants, including Taraxacum and Lactuca species. They feed by night and rest underground by day.

References

External links
"Cerastis faceta (Treitschke, 1835)". Insecta.pro.
Lepiforum e.V.

Moths described in 1835
Noctuinae
Moths of Europe
Taxa named by Georg Friedrich Treitschke